John Charles Black (January 27, 1839 – August 17, 1915) was a Democratic U.S. Congressman from Illinois. He received the Medal of Honor for his actions as a Union Army lieutenant colonel and regimental commander at the Battle of Prairie Grove during the American Civil War.

Early life
John Charles Black was born in Lexington, Mississippi, on January 27, 1839, and moved to Danville, Illinois, in 1847. His father was a minister of the Presbyterian Church. Black attended Wabash College, Crawfordsville, Indiana, and became a lawyer.

American Civil War service
On April 14, 1861, Black (along with his brother, William P. Black) entered the Union Army as a private in the 11th Indiana Volunteer Infantry Regiment on April 14, 1861. He became sergeant major on April 25, 1861.

After three months of service, the brothers were mustered out of the volunteers and organized Company "K" of the 37th Illinois Volunteer Infantry Regiment. John Black became major of the regiment on September 5, 1861. He was wounded in the right arm at the Battle of Pea Ridge, Arkansas, on March 7, 1862. On July 12, 1862, John Black was promoted to the rank of lieutenant colonel and became commander of the 37th Illinois Infantry. Black led his regiment against a fortified Confederate position during the Battle of Prairie Grove, Arkansas, on December 7, 1862. The unit suffered heavy casualties and was eventually forced to retreat. Black himself was seriously wounded. An 1896 review of numerous actions during the war resulted in John Black being awarded the Medal of Honor for his actions at Prairie Grove. Black's brother William also received the medal, making them the first of five pairs of brothers to both receive the Medal of Honor as of 2005.

On December 31, 1862, Black was promoted to colonel of the 37th Illinois Infantry Regiment. He was given temporary command of Brigade 1, Division 2, XIII Corps, Department of the Gulf, between November 11, 1863, and February 11, 1864, of Brigade 3, Division 2, Reserve Corps of the Department of the Gulf between February 3, 1865, and February 18, 1865, and of Brigade 3 Division 2, XIII Corps, Department of the Gulf, between February 18, 1865, and March 5, 1865.

Black resigned his commission in the volunteer service on August 15, 1865. On January 13, 1866, President Andrew Johnson nominated Black for appointment to the grade of brevet brigadier general of volunteers to rank from April 9, 1865, for gallant services in the assault on Fort Blakeley, Alabama on that date, and the U.S. Senate confirmed the appointment on March 12, 1866.

Medal of Honor citation

Rank and organization: Lieutenant Colonel, 37th Illinois Infantry. Place and date: At Prairie Grove, Ark., December 7, 1862. Entered service at: Danville, Ill. Born: January 27, 1839, Lexington, Holmes County, Miss. Date of issue: October 31, 1893.

Citation:

Gallantly charged the position of the enemy at the head of his regiment, after 2 other regiments had been repulsed and driven down the hill, and captured a battery; was severely wounded.

Postbellum career
Black was a member of the Illinois Commandery of the Military Order of the Loyal Legion of the United States.

Black practiced law and became the United States District Attorney at Chicago. Black was U.S. Commissioner of Pensions between 1885 and 1889. Running as a Democrat, he was elected to the Fifty-third United States Congress, and served from 1893 to 1895. Black declared himself a candidate for the Democratic Party's nomination in the 1893 Chicago mayoral special election. He established a campaign headquarters at the Palmer House Hotel in mid-November 1893. However, at the time, the Chicago Tribune opined that, "the Black candidacy is likely to languish."

In 1903, Black was honored with the office of commander-in-chief of the Grand Army of the Republic, the veterans organization for Civil War veterans of the Union Army, for 1903–1904. Black served as president of the United States Civil Service Commission from Jan 17, 1904 until resigning on Jun 10, 1913.

Death
John C. Black died August 17, 1915 at Chicago, Illinois. He is buried in Spring Hill Cemetery and Mausoleum, Danville Illinois.

See also

List of Medal of Honor recipients
List of American Civil War Medal of Honor recipients: A–F

Notes

References
 Eicher, John H., and David J. Eicher, Civil War High Commands. Stanford: Stanford University Press, 2001. .
 Hunt, Roger D. and Jack R. Brown, Brevet Brigadier Generals in Blue. Gaithersburg, MD: Olde Soldier Books, Inc., 1990. .

1839 births
1915 deaths
Illinois lawyers
United States Army Medal of Honor recipients
People of Illinois in the American Civil War
People of Indiana in the American Civil War
People from Lexington, Mississippi
People from Danville, Illinois
Union Army colonels
Wabash College alumni
American Civil War recipients of the Medal of Honor
Democratic Party members of the United States House of Representatives from Illinois
Grand Army of the Republic Commanders-in-Chief
19th-century American politicians
People from Dupont Circle
19th-century American lawyers
United States Attorneys for the Northern District of Illinois